Tangents is a collection of short stories by the science fiction writer Greg Bear. The stories originally appeared in a number of different publications.

This collection, originally published in 1989, includes:

Blood Music (later expanded into the novel Blood Music)
Sleepside Story
Webster
A Martian Ricorso
Dead Run
Schrödinger's Plague
Through Road no Whither
Tangents
Sisters
The Machineries of Joy

1989 short story collections
Short story collections by Greg Bear